Harold Dean Steward Jr. (1923-1979) was a professional football player in the National Football League. He was a member of the "Steagles", a team that was the result of a temporary merger between the Philadelphia Eagles and Pittsburgh Steelers due to the league-wide manning shortages in 1943 brought on by World War II. Steward was drafted by the military during the war, however he was not called up by his draft board until after the 1943 season. Steward's name is listed on the WW II Honor Roll, which lists the over 1,000 NFL personnel who served in the military during war. The listing of players has been inscribed on a plaque, located at the Pro Football Hall of Fame in Canton, Ohio.

References

 FOOTBALL AND AMERICA: WW II Honor Roll
 "The Steagles"—Saved Pro Football During World War II''

1923 births
Players of American football from New Jersey
Steagles players and personnel
1979 deaths
Parsippany High School alumni
People from Parsippany-Troy Hills, New Jersey
Sportspeople from Elizabeth, New Jersey
Sportspeople from Morris County, New Jersey
Ursinus Bears football players
Philadelphia Eagles players